The Cullen Baronetcy, of East Sheen, was created in the Baronetage of England on 17 June 1661 for Abraham Cullen, Member of Parliament for Evesham 1661–1668.

His second son, the third baronet, Sir Rushout Cullen, Member of Parliament for Cambridge bought the manor in the hamlet of Upton, Warwickshire along with woodland, cultivated fields and pasture.  He replaced its manor house with a surviving National Trust property, Upton House (1688–1695) and the baronetcy became extinct on his death in 1730.

Cullen of East Sheen (1661)
 Sir Abraham Cullen, 1st Baronet (1624–1668)
 Sir John Cullen, 2nd Baronet (1652–1677)
 Sir Rushout Cullen, 3rd Baronet (1661–1730)

References

East Sheen
Extinct baronetcies in the Baronetage of England
1661 establishments in England